Ashnestan (also Romanized as Āshnestān and Ashnistān) is a village in Eqbal-e Sharqi Rural District, in the Central District of Qazvin County, Qazvin Province, Iran. At the 2006 census, its population was 1,292, in 313 families.

References 

Populated places in Qazvin County